Dedeyolu is a village in the Sivrice District of Elazığ Province in Turkey. Its population is 254 (2021). The village is populated by Turks.

References

Villages in Sivrice District